Kim Hyun-chul (November 13, 1901 – February 27, 1989) was a Korean independence activist, politician and Prime Minister of South Korea(military rule).

Notes

Prime Ministers of South Korea
Finance ministers of South Korea
1901 births
1989 deaths
Korean independence activists
Ambassadors of South Korea to the United States